Angelbank (or Angel Bank) is a small settlement in south Shropshire, England.

It is located on the A4117 road, between Ludlow and Cleehill; the road goes uphill towards Clee Hill Village and this incline is called Angel Bank. There is also a lane leading off this main road called Angel Lane.

References

External links

Hamlets in Shropshire